Giant is a compilation album by American rock and roll singer Buddy Holly. The album was released as an LP record in stereo format in January 1969 (see 1969 in music).

Giant was Buddy Holly's eighth posthumously released album and the fifth album to feature previously unreleased material. The original recordings were overdubbed by the Fireballs in 1968.

The album was released on CD for the first time in 1993 by Castle Communications in the UK.

Track listing
Side A
 "Love is Strange" (Ethel Smith, Mickey Baker)
 "Good Rockin' Tonight" (Roy Brown)
 "Blue Monday" (Dave Bartholomew, Antoine Domino)
 "Have You Ever Been Lonely (Have You Ever Been Blue)" (George Brown, Peter De Rose)
 "Slippin' and Slidin'" (Albert Collins, Edwin Bocage, James Smith, Richard Penniman)
Side B	
 "You're the One" (Buddy Holly, Slim Corbin, Waylon Jennings)
 "(Ummm, Oh Yeah) Dearest"	(Bob Gibson, Ellas McDaniel, Prentice Herman Polk, Jr.)
 "Smokey Joe's Cafe" (Jerry Leiber, Mike Stoller)
 "Ain't Got No Home" (Clarence Henry)
 "Holly Hop" (Charles Hardin Holley)

Charts

Album

References

External links

Buddy Holly compilation albums
1969 compilation albums
Compilation albums published posthumously
Coral Records compilation albums
albums produced by Norman Petty